Perry Lee Warbington (September 7, 1952 – November 9, 2008) was an American professional basketball player. He played for the Philadelphia 76ers in the beginning part of the 1974–75 NBA season after being selected 145th overall by them in the 1974 NBA draft.

University
After spending two years at Florida Gateway College, he played for two seasons with the Eagles of Georgia Southern University, where he averaged 20.8 points per game.

Professional
It was chosen in position 145 of the Draft of the NBA of 1974 by Philadelphia 76ers, three with whom he played 5 games, which averaged 2.0 points and 3.2 assists. The following year, Warbington joined the Detroit Pistons, but was cut before the start of the season.

References

1952 births
2008 deaths
American men's basketball players
Basketball players from Atlanta
Florida Gateway College alumni
Georgia Southern Eagles men's basketball players
Junior college men's basketball players in the United States
People from Winder, Georgia
Philadelphia 76ers draft picks
Philadelphia 76ers players
Point guards